Deniz Yılmaz (born 26 February 1988) is a professional footballer who last played as a striker for Turkish club Gençlerbirliği. Born in West Germany, Yılmaz is of ethnic Turkish origin. Having represented Turkey internationally at various youth levels he initially sought to play for the Turkey senior national team. After not being nominated for the 2016 European Championship squad, he chose to play for Azerbaijan.

Club career
Yılmaz began his career with Bayern Munich, and made his debut for the reserve team in August 2005, as a substitute for Daniel Sikorski in a 0–0 draw with VfR Aalen. From the 2007–08 season, Yılmaz established himself as a regular in Bayern's reserve team, and was named in the first-team squad for the 2008–09 Champions League. He was named on the subs bench for the first time in a Bundesliga game against VfL Wolfsburg in October 2008. This proved to be his last involvement with Bayern's team, however, despite finishing as the top scorer for the second string in 2009–10, with thirteen goals. He was joint top scorer the following year, along with Boy Deul and Steffen Wohlfarth, but each player only managed six goals and Bayern II were relegated from the 3. Liga in last place.

In July 2011, Yılmaz joined 1. FSV Mainz 05, and made his Bundesliga debut six months later, in a 3–2 defeat to Bayer Leverkusen. He made one more appearance for Mainz in the 2011–12 season, and joined 2. Bundesliga side SC Paderborn 07 on loan for the 2012–13 season.

On 15 January 2018, Yılmaz left Bursaspor and joined Gençlerbirliği. He signed a one-and-a-half-year contract with Gençlerbirliği.

International career
Yılmaz was born in West Germany to parents of Turkish descent. Yılmaz won around 50 caps for Turkey at youth level all categories comprised, including 8 for the Turkey U21. In 2016, after years of waiting for a senior Turkish call-up, Yılmaz switched to the Azerbaijan national football team. Yılmaz made his debut for Azerbaijan in a 4-0 2018 World Cup qualification loss to Northern Ireland on 11 November 2016.

Career statistics

Honours
Turkey
 UEFA Under-17 Championship: 2005

References

External links
 
 
 
 

1988 births
Living people
People from Neu-Ulm
Sportspeople from Swabia (Bavaria)
Association football forwards
Azerbaijani footballers
Azerbaijan international footballers
Turkish footballers
Turkey youth international footballers
Turkey under-21 international footballers
Azerbaijani people of Turkish descent
Azerbaijani expatriate footballers
Expatriate footballers in Turkey
Azerbaijani expatriate sportspeople in Turkey
Turkish expatriate sportspeople in Germany
Expatriate footballers in Germany
FC Bayern Munich II players
1. FSV Mainz 05 players
SC Paderborn 07 players
Bundesliga players
2. Bundesliga players
3. Liga players
Regionalliga players
Süper Lig players
Elazığspor footballers
Trabzonspor footballers
Bursaspor footballers
Gençlerbirliği S.K. footballers
Footballers from Bavaria